The Tenth Man is a 2016 Argentine drama film directed by Daniel Burman. It was shown in the Panorama section at the 66th Berlin International Film Festival.

Cast
 Dan Breitman as Mumi Singer
 Elisa Carricajo as Mónica
 Elvira Onetto as Susy
 Alan Sabbagh as Ariel
 Adrián Stoppelman as Mamuñe
 Julieta Zylberberg as Eva

References

External links
 
 

 

2016 films
2016 drama films
Argentine drama films
2010s Spanish-language films
Films set in Buenos Aires
Films shot in Buenos Aires
Films directed by Daniel Burman
2010s Argentine films